Mundara is a village located in the Bali tehsil of Pali district of Rajasthan state, located on the Bali-Sadri Road (SH-16).

Demographics
The Mundara village has population of 7896 of which 3762 are males while 4134 are females as per Population Census 2011.

In Mundara village population of children with age 0-6 is 1049 which makes up 13.29% of total population of village. Average Sex Ratio of Mundara village is 1099 which is higher than Rajasthan state average of 928. Child Sex Ratio for the Mundara as per census is 796, lower than Rajasthan average of 888.

Mundara village has lower literacy rate compared to Rajasthan. In 2011, literacy rate of Mundara village was 63.31% compared to 66.11% of Rajasthan. In Mundara Male literacy stands at 75.83% while female literacy rate was 52.47%.good

Castes Living in Village Is - Rajpurohit(Jagirdar), Rajput, Choudhary, Rabari, Meghwal etc.

Very famous place in mundara is Shree Chamunda Mataji Mandir Mundara and Shree Karni Mata Mandir.

References

 Population of Mundara
 Mundara Coordinates

External links
 

Villages in Pali district